Title 6 or Title VI in Roman numerals, refers to the sixth part of various laws, including:
 Title VI of the Civil Rights Act of 1964
 Title 6 of the United States Code
 Title VI, Part A, § 602 of the Higher Education Act of 1965 (National Resource Center Program of the U.S. Department of Education)